Palladium Fantasy RPG Book 3: Adventures on the High Seas is a role-playing game supplement for Palladium Fantasy Role-Playing Game published by Palladium Books in 1987. An updated edition was published in 1996.

Contents
Adventures on the High Seas is a supplement including new skills, character classes (gladiator, pirate, acrobat, bard) and magic items, plus characters sheets, ship types, and rules for nautical adventures. It includes several scenarios set on a series of fully mapped-out islands.

Publication history
Adventures on the High Seas was written by Kevin Siembieda, and was published by Palladium Books in 1987 as a 208-page book.

Reception
In the November 1987 edition of Dragon (Issue 127), Ken Rolston reviewed the first edition of this book, and thought it was "Good old-fashioned, prehistoric D&D game-style fantasy adventures by the shipload." Rolston liked the extra rules and campaign supplements, calling the new character classes, magic items and curses "neat stuff." He concluded, "What it lacks in organization and sophistication, it more than makes up for in enthusiasm and imagination."

Ten years later, in the December 1997 edition of Dragon (Issue 242), Rick Swan reviewed the second edition, and was complimentary, saying, "The seafaring stuff — the best of its kind I’ve ever seen — covers the economics of sea trade, ship-to-ship combat, and naval equipment."  He gave the book an above-average rating of 5 out of 6, but concluded that it was "better for [gaming] veterans, owing to some complicated concepts."

Review
Arcane (Issue 18 - Apr 1997)

References

Palladium Fantasy Role-Playing Game supplements
Role-playing game supplements introduced in 1987